American rapper G Herbo has released five studio albums (including one collaborative album), five mixtapes, two extended plays, and forty singles (including nineteen as a featured artist).

Albums

Studio albums

Collaborative albums

Mixtapes

Extended plays

Singles

As lead artist

As featured artist

Other charted songs

Guest appearances

Notes

References 

Discographies of American artists
Hip hop discographies